Claudio Zei (born 1954) is an Italian former swimmer. He won bronze medal in 4x100 metres freestyle at the 1975 World Aquatics Championships. He was born in Florence.

Achievements

References

External links
 Swimmer profile at The-Sports.org

1954 births
Living people
Italian male freestyle swimmers
World Aquatics Championships medalists in swimming
Mediterranean Games gold medalists for Italy
Swimmers at the 1975 Mediterranean Games
Mediterranean Games medalists in swimming